The Saudi General League season 1968 -1969, is the first attempt to establish a regular league in the Kingdom of Saudi Arabia and was held 4 times between 1967 and 1970  but failed to be completed in all of them except in 1969 and the leaguen in this season was achieved by Al-Ahly Club and was the first club in Saudi history, The first league was canceled in 1966 before the second leg started and the first league contain 6 clubs : Al-Ittihad - Al-Wahda - Al-Nasr - Riyadh - Al-Ittifaq and Al-Qadisiyah, Al-Ittihad and Al-Wahda  were top of this league on the first round before this league was canceled due to the setback in June and was the first season For the Saudi league in the history of the competition, but the first successful attempt to establish the league was in 1969 after two failed attempts in the previous two seasons 1967-1966 and 1968–1967.

The semi finals played between the victory of the champion of the central region Al-Nassr against Al-Ahly the champion of the western region. Al-Ahly defeated Al-Nasr and qualified for the final. Al-Ettifaq was the eastern region champion played against Al-Jabalain the second-league champion. Al-Ittifaq won and qualified to the final of the league to meet Al-Ahly.

Al-Ahly won the league After beating Al-Itifaq in the final match 1–0, scored by Omar Rajkhan.

Championship playoff

Semifinals

Final

References

5.https://ar.wikipedia.org/wiki/%D8%AF%D8%B1%D8%B9_%D8%A7%D9%84%D8%AF%D9%88%D8%B1%D9%8A_%D8%A7%D9%84%D8%B9%D8%A7%D9%85_%D8%A7%D9%84%D8%B3%D8%B9%D9%88%D8%AF%D9%8A_1968%E2%80%9369

Saudi Premier League seasons